Mary Morris Cresswell (formerly Meyerhoff, née Howard; born 1937) is a poet living on the Kapiti Coast, New Zealand.

Early life
Cresswell was born Mary Morris Howard in 1937 in Los Angeles, California. She grew up in Evanston, Illinois, and Los Angeles. She attended the University of California, Riverside and Stanford University, graduating from the latter with a degree in history and English literature.  She was married first to the philosopher , who died in a car accident in 1965, and then married logician Max Cresswell in Los Angeles on 14 March 1970. She moved to New Zealand in 1970, and has lived in Wellington and Waikanae. Her daughter, Miriam Meyerhoff, is a sociolinguist.

Career
Cresswell worked for many years as a science editor, including ten years as editor of the Journal of the Royal Society of New Zealand, and later as an editor for scientists at the Department of Conservation. Her science background infuses her poetry, which is characterised by frequent references to the natural world, "mov[ing] between people, science and nature" and demonstrating "a strong sense of respect for natural settings and features".

Her poetry is notable for a focus on form, including rhyme. It often explores lesser-known formats such as ghazals, glossas, centos as well as more well-known forms such as the sonnet. She acknowledges the influence of the poets Kay Ryan, Paul Muldoon, and Thom Gunn on her work. In 2000 she came third in the New Zealand Poetry Society's International Poetry Competition for her poem "Observations Made in Passing", and in 2008 was highly commended in an annual poetry competition run by the journal Bravado. Her 2011 collection Trace Fossils was runner-up for the Kathleen Grattan Award. Her poems have been published in New Zealand, Australian, Canadian, American and British literary journals, including Best New Zealand Poems (2005) and Best of Best New Zealand Poems (2011).

Publications 
 Millionaire's Shortbread, with Mary-Jane Duffy, Mary Macpherson and Kerry Hines (2003, Otago University Press)
 Nearest and Dearest (2009, Steele Roberts)
 Trace Fossils (2011, Steele Roberts)
 Fish Stories (2015, Canterbury University Press)
 Field Notes (2017, Makaro Press)
 Body Politic (2020, Cuba Press)

References

External links
 Author biography, published by Read NZ Te Pou Muramura
 "Golden Weather (Cook Strait)", poem published in Best New Zealand Poems (2005)

New Zealand poets
1937 births
Living people
People from Los Angeles
American emigrants to New Zealand
Stanford University alumni